A set of networks that satisfies given structural characteristics can be treated as a network ensemble. Brought up by Ginestra Bianconi in 2007, the entropy of a network ensemble measures the level of the order or uncertainty of a network ensemble.

The entropy is the logarithm of the number of graphs. Entropy can also be defined in one network. Basin entropy is the logarithm of the attractors in one Boolean network.

Employing approaches from statistical mechanics, the complexity, uncertainty, and randomness of networks can be described by network ensembles with different types of constraints.

Gibbs and Shannon entropy
By analogy to statistical mechanics, microcanonical ensembles and canonical ensembles of networks are introduced for the implementation. A partition function Z of an ensemble can be defined as:

The auxiliary fields  and  have been introduced as analogy to the bath in classical mechanics.

For simple undirected networks, the partition function can be simplified as

where ,  is the index of the weight, and for a simple network .

Microcanonical ensembles and canonical ensembles are demonstrated with simple undirected networks.

For a microcanonical ensemble, the Gibbs entropy  is defined by:

where  indicates the cardinality of the ensemble, i.e., the total number of networks in the ensemble.

The probability of having a link between nodes i and j, with weight  is given by:

For a canonical ensemble, the entropy is presented in the form of a Shannon entropy:

Relation between Gibbs and Shannon entropy

Network ensemble  with given number of nodes  and links , and its conjugate-canonical ensemble  are characterized as microcanonical and canonical ensembles and they have Gibbs entropy  and the Shannon entropy S, respectively. The Gibbs entropy in the  ensemble is given by:

For  ensemble,

Inserting  into the Shannon entropy:

The relation indicates that the Gibbs entropy  and the Shannon entropy per node S/N of random graphs are equal in the thermodynamic limit .

Von Neumann entropy
Von Neumann entropy is the extension of the classical Gibbs entropy in a quantum context. This entropy is constructed from a density matrix : historically, the first proposed candidate for such a density matrix has been an expression of the Laplacian matrix L associated with the network. The average von Neumann entropy of an ensemble is calculated as:

For canonical power-law network ensembles, the two entropies are linearly related.

Networks with given expected degree sequences suggest that, heterogeneity in the expected degree distribution implies an equivalence between a quantum and a classical description of networks, which respectively corresponds to the von Neumann and the Shannon entropy.

This definition of the Von Neumann entropy can also be extended to multilayer networks with tensorial approach and has been used successfully to reduce their dimensionality from a structural point of perspective.

However, it has been shown that this definition of entropy does not satisfy the property of sub-additivity (see Von Neumann entropy's subadditivity), expected to hold theoretically. A more grounded definition, satisfying this fundamental property, has been introduced by De Domenico and Biamonte as a quantum-like Gibbs state

If  is interpreted as a temporal parameter, this density matrix is formally proportional to the propagator of a diffusive process on the top of the network.

This feature has been used to build a statistical field theory of complex information dynamics, where the density matrix can be interpreted in terms of the super-position of streams operators whose action is to activate information flows among nodes. The framework has been successfully applied to analyze the protein-protein interaction networks of virus-human interactomes, including the SARS-CoV-2, to unravel the systemic features of infection of the latter at microscopic, mesoscopic and macroscopic scales, as well as to assess the importance of nodes for integrating information flows within the network and the role they play in network robustness.

This approach has been generalized to deal with other types of dynamics, such as random walks, on the top of multilayer networks, providing an effective way to reduce the dimensionality of such systems without altering their structure. Using both classical and maximum-entropy random walks, the corresponding density matrices have been used to encode the network states of the human brain and to assess, at multiple scales, connectome’s information capacity at different stages of dementia.

See also
 Canonical ensemble
 Microcanonical ensemble
 Maximum-entropy random graph model
 Graph entropy

References 

Entropy and information
Entropy
Statistical mechanics